Carex chichijimensis is a species of perennial sedge of the genus Carex endemic to Chichijima Island in Japan. C. chichijimensis Katsuy belongs to sect. Graciles Tuck. ex Kük. and is a close relative of C. hattoriana Nakai which is endemic to the Ogasawara Islands. It differs from C. hattoriana in that it has larger, rather glabrous and strongly veined perigynia.

References

External links

Listed in The Journal of Japanese Botany Vol.83 No.6 (December 2008).
The Plant List is an online resource for scientific plant names of species rank.

chichijimensis
Flora of Japan
Plants described in 2008
Endemic flora of Japan